George Alexander Muthoot (born 16 September 1955) is an Indian entrepreneur and businessman who is currently the managing director of the Muthoot Group, a business conglomerate in India.

Personal life
George Alexander Muthoot was born to M George Muthoot and Ammini George Muthoot on 16 September 1955 in Kozhencherry, a small town in Kerala. M. George Muthoot managed the family business of Chit funds in Kozhencherry. He did his Bachelors in Commerce from St. Thomas College, Kozhencherry (University of Kerala), and was awarded a gold medal for obtaining the first rank in the state for the degree. He is also a Chartered Accountant certified by the ICAI, and secured All India Rank 18 for his final examinations.

He leads the Muthoot M. George Foundation (MMGF), which disburses over Rs. 250 million annually primarily for the purpose of Education and Healthcare (with focus on Kidney related ailments). Being an industry leader in the Gold Banking, in 2007 George was awarded his PhD in  "Non-Traditional Banking with special reference to Gold" by the Open International University – Colombo, Sri Lanka. He paid for an Engineering College in Kochi, named Muthoot Institute of Science and Technology.

Business career
George Alexander Muthoot was appointed as the managing director of the Muthoot Group in February 1993. The conglomerate has since grown exponentially, and is currently present in over 16 diversified industries in 4 different countries. George is also the managing director of Muthoot Finance, a pioneer in Gold Banking. With over INR 263.87 bn in Assets Under Management, Muthoot Finance is India's Largest Gold Loan company (as of May 2013). The group has various interests in sectors such as financial services, plantations, media, hospitality, healthcare, education, power generation, infrastructure and money remittance. George is the President of the Association of Gold Loan Companies, an industry lobby formed by the Gold Loan companies in India, and is also the Ex-Chairman of the Kerala Non-Banking Finance Companies Welfare Association. An industry leader in Gold Banking, George is often invited to forums such as Columbia Business School and the Indian Banking Conference (BANCON),he has also participated as a guest lecturer in IIM Kozhikode, Tricy and ISB Hyderabad. and frequently authors articles in Indian news-dailies such as The Economic Times and Hindu Business Line.

India Today, a weekly magazine, ranked George as one of the most influential people in the State of Kerala in the year 2005. Asianet, an Indian television channel, selected George as one of the Millennium leaders in 2000. Dhanam, a fortnightly magazine in India, ranked Muthoot as one of the most important business families in Kerala. In the year 2013 Dhanam Magazine also conferred upon George the prestigious Businessman of the year Award. He received the CA business Achiever Award 2013 under Financial Service sector from Institute of Chartered Accountants of India, New Delhi.

See also
 Muthoot Family
 Muthoot Group
 M George Muthoot
 M G George Muthoot

References

1954 births
People from Pathanamthitta district
Indian chief executives
Businesspeople from Kerala
Living people
Indian accountants
Muthoot Group